Bob Marley (1945–1981) was a Jamaican musician.

Bob Marley may also refer to:
Bob Marley (comedian) (born 1967), American comedian
Bob Marley (song), a song by Dean Brody
"Bob Marley", a song by Dadju

See also
 Bob Marley and the Wailers
 Bob Marley Museum

Marley, Bob